St Luke's Church is in Church Lane, Oakhanger, Cheshire, England.  It is an active Anglican mission church in the parish of Christ Church, Alsager, the deanery of Congleton, the archdeaconry of Macclesfield, and the diocese of Chester.  The church is recorded in the National Heritage List for England as a designated Grade II listed building.

History

The building was originally a school chapel with an attached master's house that was erected in 1870.

Architecture

St Luke's is constructed in red brick and stands on a blue brick plinth.  It is roofed with blue tiles.  The plan consists of a two-bay nave, a lower and narrower chancel, and a porch.  On the ridge of the roof is a bellcote, set diagonally.  The windows have pointed arches and contain intersecting glazing bars.  Inside the church is an oak pulpit.  The altar incorporates a panel containing the figures of Faith, Hope, and Charity.

See also

Listed buildings in Haslington

References

Church of England church buildings in Cheshire
Grade II listed churches in Cheshire
Churches completed in 1870
19th-century Church of England church buildings
Gothic Revival church buildings in England
Gothic Revival architecture in Cheshire
Diocese of Chester